Robbie Nell Tilley Branscum (June 17, 1934 – May 24, 1997) was an American writer of children's books and young adult fiction. Her books were awarded with a Friends of American Writers Award (1977) and an Edgar Award (1983).

Early life and education
Robbie was born on a farm near Big Flat, Arkansas. Her father died when she was only four years old and she grew up with her poor grandparents on another farm. Branscum dropped out from school after the seventh grade. She continued to read books and write poetry and songs and provided for her livelihood through work at dirt farms. At the age of 15 she married Dwane Branscum. She gave birth to a daughter and divorced at the age of 25.

Writer career
Branscum's life took a major turn after the newsletter of her church, the Southern Baptist, printed an article she had written. Subsequently, she decided to become an author. Branscum's first book was Me and Jim Luke (1971).

Branscum published 20 books in 20 years time, though not one each year. Several of her books were translated into Danish, Italian, Japanese, and Swedish. Branscum worked with literary agent Barthold Fles, who described her as "the worst speller and best writer I have."

In 1977, she won an Award of Merit from the Friends of American Writers for Toby, Granny and George and in 1983 an Edgar Award for The Murder of Hound Dog Bates.

Death 
She died from a heart attack in 1997 in her home in San Pablo, California.

Honors and awards
 1977 – Friends of American Writers Award of Merit for Toby, Granny and George
 1979 – Best of the Best 1966–1978, School Library Journal, for Johnny May
 1983 – Edgar Award, Category: Best Juvenile, for The Murder of Hound Dog Bates

Books
 1971 – Me and Jim Luke
 1975 – Three Wars of Billy Joe Treat
 1976 – Johnny May
 1977 – Toby, Granny and George
 1978 – Three Buckets of Daylight (with Allen Davis)
 1978 – To the Tune of a Hickory Stick
 1978 – The Ugliest Boy
 1979 – For Love of Jody (with Allen Davis)
 1979 – The Saving of P.S.
 1979 – Toby Alone
 1981 – Toby and Johnny Joe
 1982 – The Murder of Hound Dog Bates
 1983 – Cheater and Flitter Dick
 1983 – Spud Tackett
 1984 – The Adventures of Johnnie May
 1986 – The Girl
 1987 – Johnny May Grows Up
 1989 – Cameo Rose
 1991 – Old Blue Tiley
 1991 – Never Pa's Girl

References

External links

Robbie Tilley Branscum in the Encyclopedia of Arkansas
"Her Books for Children Told of Poor, Rural America" by Wolfgang Saxon – Obituary in the Pittsburgh Post-Gazette
 Five facts about Robbie Branscum by Deborah Branscum on Branscum.net [archived]

1934 births
1997 deaths
20th-century American novelists
American children's writers
American women novelists
Baptists from Arkansas
Baptist writers
Farmworkers
People from Baxter County, Arkansas
Writers from Arkansas
American women children's writers
20th-century American women writers
Edgar Award winners
People from San Pablo, California
Writers from California
20th-century Baptists